Josías Manzanillo Adams (born October 16, 1967) is a Dominican former Major League Baseball pitcher who played in the major leagues from  to .

In , Manzanillo suffered a grisly injury while pitching for the Seattle Mariners. Not wearing a protective cup, he was struck in the groin by a line drive off the bat of Manny Ramírez which ruptured his testicles. Manzanillo managed to recover the baseball, throw out Jim Thome at home plate and sprint off the field under his own power before undergoing emergency reconstructive surgery.

On December 13, 2007, Manzanillo was one of many athletes mentioned in the detailed Mitchell Report by former Senator George Mitchell. In the report, former New York Mets clubhouse attendant Kirk Radomski claimed that in 1994 Manzanillo asked Radomski to inject him with the steroid Deca-Durabolin, which Radomski did. Radomski stated that he remembered the event clearly because it was the only time he ever injected a player with steroids, and indeed the only time he actually saw a player use steroids. Manzanillo denied ever having used performance-enhancing drugs, saying that he once paid Radomski $200–$250 for one cycle of steroids but then "chickened out or thought better of it" and never took possession of the drugs.

Personal
His brother, Ravelo Manzanillo, played three seasons for two teams, as well as eighteen seasons for various Minor League and international teams. On June 30, 1994, they became the first pair of brothers to both earn a save on the same day.

See also
 List of Major League Baseball players named in the Mitchell Report

References

External links
, Pelota Binaria (Venezuelan Winter League)

1967 births
Living people
Albuquerque Isotopes players
Boston Red Sox players
Cincinnati Reds players
Dominican Republic expatriate baseball players in Mexico
Dominican Republic expatriate baseball players in the United States
Dominican Summer League Red Sox players
Durham Bulls players
Elmira Pioneers players
Florida Marlins players
Greensboro Hornets players
Hickory Crawdads players

Leones del Escogido players
Louisville Bats players
Major League Baseball pitchers
Major League Baseball players from the Dominican Republic
Memphis Chicks players
Mexican League baseball pitchers
Milwaukee Brewers players
Nashville Sounds players
New Britain Red Sox players
New Orleans Zephyrs players
New York Mets players
New York Yankees players
Norfolk Tides players
Omaha Royals players
Pastora de los Llanos players
Pawtucket Red Sox players
Pericos de Puebla players
Pittsburgh Pirates players
Seattle Mariners players
Tacoma Rainiers players
Winter Haven Red Sox players
Sportspeople from San Pedro de Macorís
Dominican Republic expatriate baseball players in Venezuela